Railway Ground is a multi purpose stadium located in Railway Colony in Ratlam, Madhya Pradesh, India. The ground is mainly used for organizing matches of football, cricket and other sports.

The stadium hosted  one first-class matches  from 1967 when Holkar cricket team played against Rajputana cricket team. until 1987 but since then the stadium has hosted non first-class cricket matches.

References

External links 
 cricketarchive
 cricinfo
 Wikimapia
 

Cricket grounds in Madhya Pradesh
Sports venues in Madhya Pradesh
Ratlam
Sports venues completed in 1967
1967 establishments in Madhya Pradesh
20th-century architecture in India